Jump5 is the self-titled debut album from Christian pop group of the same name. It was released on August 14, 2001 through Sparrow Records. Two re-releases followed: the first featured the "Start Jumpin'" bonus track targeted towards Christian audiences, while the second featured a Radio Disney-targeted version of "Start Jumpin'" with different lyrics plus a cover of Lee Greenwood's "God Bless the U.S.A." to remember the lives lost after the September 11 attacks. A portion of sales from the second re-release was donated to families who lost a loved one during the attacks on September 11, 2001.

"Spinnin' Around" was released as the album's lead Radio Disney single.  A music video for this song was also filmed for release on VHS and DVD. The Radio Disney versions of "Start Jumpin'" and "God Bless the USA" were both released for airplay on Radio Disney.

Track listing

First re-release

Second re-release

Home media
A VHS and DVD home video release acting as a companion to the album was released on March 26, 2002. It includes the music videos for "Spinnin' Around" and "God Bless the U.S.A." as well as interviews with the group.

Featured 
The song "Spinnin' Around" appeared in the video game Disney's Extreme Skate Adventure.

References 

2001 albums
Jump5 albums
Sparrow Records albums